The Hellenic Cup is an Australian football (soccer) tournament contested by Greek Australian clubs, mostly from Melbourne, Victoria . Starting in 1983, it was an attempt to formalise the previously scattered approach to holding such tournaments in the 1960s and 1970s.

The Hellenic Cup Tournament trophy is housed in the Museum of National Centre for Hellenic Studies & Research at La Trobe University, Bundoora.

History of Tournaments

Winners
6 Bentleigh Greens (1991, 1996, 1997, 2002, 2003, 2010)
4 South Melbourne FC (1984, 2007, 2009, 2011)
4 Oakleigh Cannons (1987, 1990, 2001, 2006)
3 Northcote City SC (1985, 1986, 1999)
3 Altona East Phoenix (1992, 2004, 2013)
2 Port Melbourne Sharks (1994, 1995)
2 Kingston City FC (1984, 1993)
1 Heidelberg United (2008)
1 Yarraville Glory (2000)
1 Caufield Citys (1983)
1 Western Suburbs SC (2012)

Ladies
Heidelberg United Champions 2006, 2007, 2008, 2009, 2010, 2012
Southern Suburbs Runners Up 2006
Bentleigh Greens Runners Up 2007
South Melbourne FC Runners Up 2008
Ashburton Runners Up 2010
Box Hill United Runners Up 2012

Youth
Brunswick City Champions 2006, Runners Up 2007
Oakleigh Cannons Champions 2007, 2008
Heidelberg United Champions 2010, 2011
South Melbourne FC Runners Up 2010
Northcote City Runners Up 2006
Bentleight Greens Runners Up 2011
Doncaster Rovers Runners Up 2008

Veterans
3XY Radio Hellas Champions 2007, Runners Up 2008
Lalor FC Champions 2011
Southern Suburbs Champions 2008
Altona East Phoenix Champions 2012
Malvern Kinisi Runners Up 2012
Heidelberg United Alexander Runners Up 2007
Bayside Argonauts Champions 2009, 2010, Runners Up 2011
Kingston City FC Runners Up 2010

Participants
3XY Radio Hellas (Veterans)
Altona East Phoenix PAOK
Ashburton (Women's)
Bayside Argonauts (Veterans)
Bentleigh Greens Pagkyprios
Box Hill United
Braeside United Lemnos Soccer Club Lemnos
Brunswick City Leonidas
Caufield City
Caufield United Cobras Lemnos
Clayton FC
Clifton Hill United FC
Darebin United FC
Doncaster Rovers (Ladies)
East Richmond Jaguars
Essendon United Kos
Hawthorn United
Harrisfield Hurricanes
Heidelberg United Megas Alexandros
Hellenic Moorabbin
Hobart Olympia Warriors
Keon Park FC Panathinaikos
Kingston City FC
Lalor FC Florina
Leros United Leros
Malvern City
Mill Park FC
Mordialloc Hermes
Northcote City SC Iraklis
Nunawading City (Youth)
Oakleigh Cannons
Panathinaikos (Veterans)
Pansseraikos (Veterans)
Port Melbourne Nea Ellas
Southern Suburbs Pythagoras
South Melbourne FC Ellas Melvournis
South Spirngvale SC Aris
South Springvale Serres
Traralgon Olympians
Upfield Atromitos
Wantirna South
Waverley Wanderers AEK
Western Suburbs SC Panellinios
West Preston SC Antagoras
Westvale Olympic
Yiannis Tavern (Veterans)
Yarraville Glory Doxa

External links

Greek-Australian culture
Soccer cup competitions in Australia
Recurring sporting events established in 1983
Greek-Australian culture in Melbourne